Kateryna Orestivna Kit-Sadova (born 30 September 1974) is a Ukrainian art critic and businesswoman, co-owner of the media holding TRK Lux media, which includes radio stations Radio Maximum, Nostalgie, Lux FM, website Zaxid.net, TV channels Football 24, Channel 24, and advertising agency "Lux". 

Kit-Sadova is married to Mayor of Lviv Andriy Sadovyi. They have five sons: Ivan, Tadey, Mykhailo, Yosyp and Anthony.

References

1974 births
Living people
Ukrainian women in business
20th-century Ukrainian businesspeople
21st-century Ukrainian businesspeople
20th-century Ukrainian women
21st-century Ukrainian women